Albert Bush-Brown (1926-1994) was an American architectural historian and university president.  He was chancellor and president of Long Island University (1971–1985) and president of Rhode Island School of Design (1962–1968)  He also taught art history at Princeton, Harvard, Case Western Reserve, and Massachusetts Institute of Technology.

He authored several books, including Louis Sullivan (1960) and The Architecture of America: A Social Interpretation (1961).

He attended Princeton University and Deep Springs College.

References

1926 births
1994 deaths
American art historians
Presidents of Long Island University
Long Island University faculty
Princeton University alumni
Deep Springs College alumni
Rhode Island School of Design faculty
People from West Hartford, Connecticut
20th-century American historians
20th-century American male writers
Presidents of the Rhode Island School of Design
American male non-fiction writers
Historians from Connecticut
20th-century American academics